Lochte is a German surname found in both Germany and the United States. Notable people with the surname include:

 Karin Lochte (born 1952), German oceanographer, researcher, and climate-change specialist
 Ryan Lochte (born 1984), American swimmer and Olympic medalist

See also
 What Would Ryan Lochte Do?, 2013 reality television series
 Lochtegate, a scandal involving United States swim team members Ryan Lochte, Jimmy Feigen, Gunnar Bentz, and Jack Conger during the 2016 Summer Olympics
 Frederik Løchte Nielsen (born 1983), Danish professional male tennis player 

German-language surnames